Chromosome 20 is one of the 23 pairs of chromosomes in humans. Chromosome 20 spans around 66 million base pairs (the building material of DNA) and represents between 2 and 2.5 percent of the total DNA in cells. Chromosome 20 was fully sequenced in 2001 and was reported to contain over 59 million base pairs.  Since then, due to sequencing improvements and fixes, the length of chromosome 20 has been updated to just over 66 million base pairs.

Genes

Number of genes 
The following are some of the gene count estimates of human chromosome 20. Because researchers use different approaches to genome annotation their predictions of the number of genes on each chromosome varies (for technical details, see gene prediction). Among various projects, the collaborative consensus coding sequence project (CCDS) takes an extremely conservative strategy. So CCDS's gene number prediction represents a lower bound on the total number of human protein-coding genes.

Gene list 

The following is a partial list of genes on human chromosome 20. For complete list, see the link in the infobox on the right.

Diseases and disorders
The following diseases are some of those related to genes on chromosome 20:

Albright's hereditary osteodystrophy
Arterial tortuosity syndrome
Adenosine deaminase deficiency
Alagille syndrome
Fatal familial insomnia
Galactosialidosis - CTSA
Maturity onset diabetes of the young type 1
Neuronal ceroid lipofuscinosis
Pantothenate kinase-associated neurodegeneration
Transmissible spongiform encephalopathy (prion diseases)
Waardenburg syndrome

Cytogenetic band

References

External links

 
 

Chromosomes (human)